Flora of the Colorado Desert, located in Southern California. The Colorado Desert is a sub-region in the Sonoran Desert ecoregion of southwestern North America. It is also known as the Low Desert, in contrast to the higher elevation Mojave Desert or High Desert, to its north.

Plant communities
The desert flora comprises terrestrial plant communities including: creosote bush scrub; alkali sink, desert dry wash, mixed scrub; desert saltbush; sandy soil grasslands; desert dunes. The higher elevation Madrean Sky Islands are dominated by pinyon pine and California juniper (Juniperus californica), with areas of Manzanita and Coulter pine (Pinus coulteri).

More than half of the Colorado Desert's plant species are herbaceous annuals, and appropriately timed winter rains produce abundant early Spring wildflowers. In the southern portion of the region, the additional moisture supplied by summer rainfall fosters the germination of summer annual plants. The summer monsoons also support smoketree, Desert Ironwood, and palo verde trees in desert washes. Hardy perennials and the

Wetland biota
In the Colorado Desert's arid environment, aquatic and wetland habitats are limited in extent but are critically important to wildlife. Runoff from seasonal rains and groundwater emergence flow seasonally in desert bajadas and washes, arroyos, and ephemeral streams, and brine lakes.

Springs and seeps feed oases, freshwater marshes, and a few foothill perennial streams year round.  desert riparian vegetation communities dominated by cottonwood, willow, and non-native tamarisk. Two of the region's most significant aquatic systems are the Salton Sea and the Colorado River.

While most desert wildlife depend on aquatic habitats as water sources, a number of species, such as the arroyo toad, desert pupfish, Yuma rail, and southwestern willow flycatcher, are restricted to these habitats. In some places, summer rains produce short-lived seasonal pools that host uncommon species like Couch's spadefoot toad.

Desert California fan palm oases are rare ecological communities found only in the Colorado Desert. They occur only where permanent water sources are available, such as at springs or along fault lines, where groundwater is forced to the surface by the movement of hard impermeable rock, and can be found in: the canyons of the San Jacinto Mountains, Santa Rosa Mountains, and Little San Bernardino Mountains, and Anza-Borrego Desert State Park; and along the San Andreas Fault in the Coachella Valley. The only palm native to California, Washingtonia filifera (California fan palm), grows in natural groves at the oases.

Evolutionary history
Salton Sink

Environmental factors
Ecotones
Microclimates
North American Monsoons — aka: Mexican monsoons, Southwestern U.S. monsoons, Arizona monsoons.

Vegetation types
Vegetation types and habitats are differentiated by elevation
The higher elevation Madrean Sky Islands support Single-leaf Pinyon pine (Pinus monophylla) and California juniper (Juniperus californica), with areas of Manzanita and Coulter pine (Pinus coulteri).

Desert riparian habitats support Fremont cottonwood (Populus fremontii), willows (Salix species). Introduced Tamarisk trees are an invasive species in these areas.

Flora

Endemic species
Endemic flora species of the Colorado Desert include:
Hesperocallis undulata — Desert lily
Nolina bigelovii — Bigelow's nolina
Peucephyllum schottii —  Desert fir
Salvia greatae — Orocopia sage
Astragalus lentiginosus var. coachellae — Coachella Valley Milkvetch

Species endemic to California habitats, found in the Colorado Desert include:
Astragalus tricarinatus — Triplerib milkvetch
Chorizanthe parryi — Parry's spineflower 
Ericameria pinifolia — Pinebush
Leptosyne bigelovii — Bigelow coreopsis
Pholisma sonorae — Sandfood

See also

Natural history of the Colorado Desert
List of flora of the Sonoran Desert Region by common name
Flora of the California desert regions
Flora of the Sonoran Deserts
Fauna of the Colorado Desert

References

F
.Colorado
.Colorado
F